Libia Grueso is a social worker and civil rights activist from Buenaventura, Colombia, fighting for civil rights of Afro-Colombian communities.

She is also co-founder of the Process of Black Communities (PCN). She managed to secure more than 24,000 km² in territorial rights for the country's black rural communities, and she has been focused on protecting Colombia's Pacific rainforest. Libia Grueso received the Goldman Environmental Prize in 2004.

References

Colombian women
Colombian environmentalists
Colombian women environmentalists
Civil rights activists
Living people
Year of birth missing (living people)
Goldman Environmental Prize awardees
Women civil rights activists